Preston W. Farrar was an American lawyer and politician. He served in the Mississippi House of Representatives from Wilkinson County. In 1848 he served as Speaker of the Louisiana House of Representatives.

In 1847, he served on the first board of the University of Louisiana.

He died in 1850.

See also
Alexander K. Farrar

References

Year of birth missing
Tulane University people
19th-century American politicians
1850 deaths
People from Wilkinson County, Mississippi
Speakers of the Louisiana House of Representatives
Members of the Louisiana House of Representatives
Members of the Mississippi House of Representatives